The Santa Vitoria do Palmar meteorite was found near the city of Santa Vitoria do Palmar in Brazil in 2003 (three stones) and 2004 (one stone).

History
On 25 June 1997 at 07:00 local time a dramatic blue and green fireball and coal black smoke trail set against a clear blue sky was witnessed by many people in the area. 

The first three stones were found by Roberto Macielin while collecting Indian arrows in March 2003. The fourth by Lautaro Côrreira in February 2004.

, pieces of the Santa Vitoria do Palmar meteorite were advertised online at around /g.

Mineralogy
The surface of the meteorite is covered in a fusion crust with several indentations (regmaglypts). The meteorite is almost entirely made from chondrules. Both the matrix and chondrules contain olivine and pyroxene. Accessory minerals include meteoric iron (kamacite, taenite and plessite), magnetite, troilite, plagioclase, schreibersite, maskelynite and chromite.

Classification
The meteorite is classified as an Ordinary chondrite of the L group. The petrologic type is 3. Shock stage is 3 or 4 and weathering is class 2.

See also
 Glossary of meteoritics

References

Chondrite meteorites
Meteorites found in Brazil